Cookoo Cavaliers is a 1940 short subject directed by Jules White starring American slapstick comedy team The Three Stooges (Moe Howard, Larry Fine and Curly Howard). It is the 51st entry in the series released by Columbia Pictures starring the comedians, who released 190 shorts for the studio between 1934 and 1959.

Plot
The Stooges are unsuccessful fish salesmen in San Diego. After becoming fed up with it all, they decide go into the saloon business but accidentally purchase a salon in the sleepy fictional village of Cucaracha, Mexico. Undaunted, the trio try their hand at giving a customer, Rosita (Dorothy Appleby) a mud pack using, natural, real mud that is actually cement. After chiseling the cement off her face, the boys scalp three other Mexican beauties but however Larry used the hair remover on the other three girls. Just then, Señor Manuel (Bob O'Connor) (the girls boss) threatens to kill the Stooges right after what they've done to Rosita and finally removing the three girls' hair bald and then Señor Manuel and the girls were very angry and the Stooges ran off before having their bottoms shot full of holes by Rosita and her sisters' handguns.

Production notes
Filmed on June 6–10, 1940, the working title of Cookoo Cavaliers was  Beauty á la Mud.

In one scene where Moe throws a bottle of hair remover, the bottle breaks on a wall and spills on a dog. Curly cleans off the dog, yet we do not see the dog losing its hair. This was due to a continuity error and the scene was never resolved.

The "cookoo" in the title is often misspelled as "cuckoo."

References

External links 
 
 
Cookoo Cavaliers at threestooges.net

1940 films
The Three Stooges films
1940s English-language films
American black-and-white films
Films directed by Jules White
1940 comedy films
Columbia Pictures short films
American slapstick comedy films
1940s American films